Kolorah High School is a school located at  Kolorah Howrah, India. This is a Bengali medium school and is affiliated to the West Bengal Board of Secondary Education for Madhyamik Pariksha (10th Board exams), and to the West Bengal Council of Higher Secondary Education for Higher Secondary Examination (12th Board exams). The school was founded in 1907.

See also
Education in India
List of schools in India
Education in West Bengal

References

External links

High schools and secondary schools in West Bengal
Schools in Howrah district
Educational institutions established in 1907
1907 establishments in India